Odeneho Gyapong Ababio II was a traditional ruler in Ghana and Paramount Chief of Sefwi-Bekwai in the Western North  Region. His official title was Sefwi-Bekwai Omanhene  - King of Sefwi-Bekwai. He was the tenth president of the National House of Chiefs and served from 2001 to 2008.

References 

Ghanaian leaders
People from Western Region (Ghana)

Living people
Year of birth missing (living people)